Mehmood Mandviwalla is a Pakistani lawyer and former caretaker Provincial Minister of Sindh who served in 2013 caretaker ministry.

He is a cousin of Saleem Mandviwalla.

Education
He holds a degree in LLB (Hons) from the London School of Economics.

References

Living people
Pakistani lawyers
Provincial ministers of Sindh
Pakistani people of Gujarati descent
Alumni of the London School of Economics
Year of birth missing (living people)